Frederick Richard Simms (12 August 1863 – 22 April 1944) was a British mechanical engineer, businessman, prolific inventor and motor industry pioneer. Simms coined the words "petrol" and "motorcar". He founded the Royal Automobile Club, and the Society of Motor Manufacturers and Traders.

Family and education

Simms was born in Hamburg "of an old Warwickshire family", the son of Frederick Louis Simms and his wife Antonia née Hermans. His Birmingham-born grandfather had established a trading company there to support the Newfoundland fishing fleet.  Frederick Richard Simms' first wife was Austrian, his second, married 1910, was Mabel Louise, daughter of cotton merchant Joseph Worsley and they had two daughters, one of which was Rosemary Mabel who married the Artist Dennis Ramsay.  He was educated in Germany and London and at the Polytechnischer Verein in Berlin after completing an apprenticeship with AG fur Automatischen Verkauf in Hamburg and Berlin.

In a 1907 trip to the Alps, Simms discovered a waterfall near the village of Holzgau, now called the Simmswasserfall.

Simms may have spread his talents a little thinly to be able to show a single outstanding achievement. His lasting significance is in his role as a catalyst and intermediary between Britain and Europe and to a lesser extent USA.

He died in his 81st year, at Stoke Poges, Buckinghamshire, while living at Storth Oaks, Chislehurst, Kent. His wife predeceased him.

Business

Consulting engineer and Daimler motors
In 1889, the 26-year-old Simms met and became firm friends with Gottlieb Daimler, from whom in 1890 he purchased the rights for the use and manufacture of Daimler's high-speed petrol engine and other patents, in the British Empire – 'England and the colonies' (excluding Canada). They were first used in motor launches but soon paved the way for the start-up of the British motor industry. In May 1890 his mechanic Johann van Toll was sent ahead to look after their borrowed launch at Putney and van Toll obtained premises in the new Billiter Buildings at 49 Leadenhall Street, London for Simms & Co Consulting Engineers.  There had been no purpose in Simms bringing a car with him because of the restrictions in Britain.

In May 1891, Simms demonstrated the motor launch on the Thames, and in May 1893 formed The Daimler Motor Syndicate Limited to fit petrol engines into boats becoming, possibly, the UK's first motor company. This work was performed under Putney Bridge, where the launches were shown.

Following the signal success of Daimler-powered Peugeots and Panhards at the 1894 Paris-Rouen Trials, Simms decided to open a motor car factory. In June 1895, Simms and Evelyn Ellis bought in France and brought to England one of the first petrol–powered cars into the UK.

In early 1896, Lawson's British Motor Syndicate Limited (about to incorporate The Daimler Motor Company Limited), bought The Daimler Motor Syndicate Limited. In early 1896, Simms was appointed a director of Stuttgart's Daimler Motoren Gesellschaft which later became Daimler-Benz.  He remained consulting engineer to Lawson's The Daimler Motor Company Limited but, perhaps wisely, did not join its board of directors.

This Emancipation Day drive is still commemorated by its annual replay, the London to Brighton Veteran Car Run.

Simms founded the Automobile Club of Great Britain (later the RAC) in 1897. He also assisted with the foundation of what became the Royal Aero Club.

Simms' Motor War Car was the first armoured car ever built.  It was designed and ordered in April 1899 and a single prototype was built by Vickers, Sons & Maxim on a special Coventry-built Daimler chassis with a German-built Daimler motor.  Due to various mishaps Vickers was unable to complete it until early 1902 after the end of the Boer War.

In 1902 he founded, and was elected the first president of the Society of Motor Manufacturers and Traders (SMMT).

Simms-Bosch Magneto

In conjunction with Robert Bosch he invented developed and patented the Simms-Bosch ignition magneto. It enabled engine designers to precisely time the ignition of fuel because it was tied to the rotation of the engine.  Their initial low-tension system was not an unqualified success but they became the first to develop a practical high-tension magneto. In 1899 they established the jointly owned Compagnie des Magnetos Simms-Bosch but it foundered in 1906 on personal differences between the partners.

In 1907 Simms established the Simms Magneto Company Ltd to manufacture magnetos under licence from Robert Bosch but he was unable to compete with European prices and it closed in 1913.  He had however contributed to Bosch's business by his stimulus to their further product development and in opening up the French market for Bosch.

Simms Motor Units
In 1913 Simms started Simms Motor Units Ltd, at first to sell and repair components, in particular dynamos and magnetos.  In World War I it became the principal supplier of magnetos to the armed forces, mainly from his Simms Magneto Company Limited of New Jersey which he had established in 1910. Another subsidiary was set up in 1915, Standard Insulator Company Limited.  In 1920, following the virtual destruction of the Kilburn works by fire, the company took over a former piano factory in East Finchley, north London. A separate subsidiary to manufacture Simms-Vernier couplings (a method of adjusting the magneto's ignition timing) was set up in Lyons, France. During the 1930s the factory developed in conjunction with Leyland Motors a range of diesel fuel injectors, in particular the Uniflow injection pump of 1937. In World War II the company again became the principal supplier of magnetos for aircraft and tanks, also supplying dynamos, starter motors, lights, pumps, nozzles, spark plugs and coils. Experimentation with compound metals for electrical contacts led to Compound Electro Metals Limited.

The East Finchley factory continued to expand after the war, eventually reaching , and the company took over many other firms.  Simms Motor Units was itself taken over by Lucas CAV in 1968.  Manufacturing in East Finchley was steadily run down as UK manufacturers lost market share.  The factory closed in 1991 to be redeveloped for housing. It is commemorated by Simms Gardens and Lucas Gardens.

Simms Manufacturing

Simms acquired some of the foreign patent rights to the petrol engine.  In 1900 he set up Simms Manufacturing Company Ltd in Bermondsey and moved the business in 1902 to Welbeck Works in Kimberley Road, Kilburn.  There they made Simms-Welbeck cars, lorries and marine engines, fire engines, agricultural vehicles, military vehicles and guns, and aeronautical devices until about 1908. Simms invented the first rubber bumper and a prototype indicator.

See also
 The Daimler Company Limited
 History of East Finchley, Simms Motors

Notes

References

External links

 RAC 
 History of the Lucas Factory East Finchley
 1934 workshop manual for SF4 & SF6 Simms magnetos

1863 births
1944 deaths
British automotive pioneers
British automotive engineers
British founders of automobile manufacturers
Daimler people
Members of the Early Birds of Aviation
British inventors